Tracey Leanne Oliver (born 26 May 1975), is a Paralympic swimming competitor from Australia.  She was in born in Bundaberg, Queensland. At the 1992 Barcelona Games, she won a bronze medal in Women's 50 m Freestyle S7 event. She also competed in Women's 100m Freestyle and 100m Backstroke S7 events. She won a silver medal at the 1996 Atlanta Games in the Women's 50 m Freestyle S7 event and also competed in the Women's 100m Freestyle and 100m Backstroke S7 events . She was an Australian Institute of Sport Athlete with a Disability scholar holder from 1994 to 1995. She works as a swimming coach in Bundaberg.

References

Female Paralympic swimmers of Australia
Swimmers at the 1996 Summer Paralympics
Paralympic silver medalists for Australia
Paralympic bronze medalists for Australia
Australian Institute of Sport Paralympic swimmers
Sportspeople from Bundaberg
1975 births
Living people
Medalists at the 1992 Summer Paralympics
Medalists at the 1996 Summer Paralympics
Paralympic medalists in swimming
Australian female freestyle swimmers
Medalists at the World Para Swimming Championships
Australian female backstroke swimmers
S7-classified Paralympic swimmers
20th-century Australian women